Gheorghe "Gicu" Teodor Grozav (born 29 September 1990) is a Romanian professional footballer who plays as a winger or an attacking midfielder for Liga I club Petrolul Ploiești.

Club career

Unirea Alba Iulia
Grozav started his career at his hometown club Unirea Alba Iulia, playing his first match in the 2007–08 Liga II season. In the summer of 2009, after two years in the Romanian Liga II, Grozav wanted to score a move away at Standard Liège as a free agent. He was later forced by UEFA to sign for another three years with the club for which he was a junior.

On 1 September 2009, Gicu Grozav made his Liga I debut in a 1–0 defeat against FC Brașov.

Standard Liège
László Bölöni eventually brought Grozav to Belgium in January 2010, signing for Standard Liège for an undisclosed fee, whilst Unirea Alba Iulia retained 15% of the players rights. He got limited playing time in his first two years with the team, only making 15 league appearances.

For the 2011–12 season Grozav was transferred to Liga I team Universitatea Cluj on a one-year loan move. He refound his form here as he helped his team to an eighth-place finish.

Petrolul Ploiești
In the summer of 2012 Gicu Grozav signed a three-year contract with Petrolul Ploiești after a number of his teammates also signed with the Yellow Wolves. On 8 August 2013, he scored the decisive goal against Dutch outfit Vitesse Arnhem in the 95th minute to make sure Petrolul Ploiești progressed to the Europa League last preliminary round for the first time in the club's history. On 25 August 2013, Grozav scored a consolation goal with a superb overhead kick at Swansea City in the play-off.

Terek Grozny
On 28 August 2013 he joined the Russian Premier League side Terek Grozny for a rumoured fee of €2.1 million.

On 2 February 2015, Grozav once again returned to Romania, signing for Dinamo București on loan.

Turkey
On 27 July 2017, Grozav joined Turkish Süper Lig side Kardemir Karabükspor on a three-year contract. On 19 August, he scored on his league debut for the club in a 3–1 home win over İstanbul Başakşehir.

Grozav was signed by Bursaspor on a six-month contract with the option of another two years on 17 January 2018.

Return to Dinamo București
On 2 October 2018, Grozav re-signed for Dinamo București. He was released from his contract on 2 November.

Hungary
On 16 January 2019, Grozav signed for Kisvárda FC. On 31 March 2020, Kisvárda terminated Grozav's contract when he and teammate Iasmin Latovlevici left for Romania without permission during the COVID-19 pandemic.

Return to Petrolul Ploiești

On 14 June 2022, Petrolul Ploiești announced that Grozav would be returning to the club and commence training the following day.

International career
Grozav made his debut for the senior team in a friendly match against Switzerland on 30 May 2012, where he scored the winning goal. This was the first-ever goal scored for the full side by a player born after the Romanian Revolution. On 12 October 2012, Grozav netted the only goal of a 1–0 victory over Turkey at the Şükrü Saracoğlu Stadium.

Personal life
Grozav's uncle, Cornel Țălnar, also played football for Dinamo București, Petrolul Ploiești and Unirea Alba Iulia. In May 2022, he married handballer Sorina Tîrcă.

Career statistics

Club

International

International goals
Scores and results list Romania's goal tally first, score column indicates score after each Grozav goal

Honours
Unirea Alba Iulia
Liga II: 2008–09

Standard Liège
Belgian Cup: 2010–11

Petrolul Ploiești
Cupa României: 2012–13
Supercupa României runner-up: 2013

References

External links

1990 births
Living people
Sportspeople from Alba Iulia
Romanian footballers
Association football midfielders
Liga I players
Liga II players
CSM Unirea Alba Iulia players
Belgian Pro League players
Standard Liège players
FC Universitatea Cluj players
FC Petrolul Ploiești players
Russian Premier League players
FC Akhmat Grozny players
FC Dinamo București players
Süper Lig players
Kardemir Karabükspor footballers
Nemzeti Bajnokság I players
Kisvárda FC players
Bursaspor footballers
Romania under-21 international footballers
Romania international footballers
Romanian expatriate footballers
Expatriate footballers in Belgium
Romanian expatriate sportspeople in Belgium
Expatriate footballers in Russia
Romanian expatriate sportspeople in Russia
Expatriate footballers in Turkey
Romanian expatriate sportspeople in Turkey
Expatriate footballers in Hungary
Romanian expatriate sportspeople in Hungary
Diósgyőri VTK players
MTK Budapest FC players